This is a list of all major airports in Poland with unpaved runways (grass, gravel or dirt). All airports with unpaved runways also sharing a paved runway are not listed here. Since almost any approved flat area can be assigned as landing area or airfield, the following list is limited to unpaved airfields with a distinct purpose and functionality (in the present or in the past). Note that only the longest runway per airport has been listed. For a complete list of paved airports in Poland see "Airports in Poland with paved runways", for highway strips see "Highway strips in Poland".

See also
List of airports in Poland
List of airports in Poland with paved runways
List of airports

References

Unpaved